Mount Hallgren is a mountain, largely ice-covered, with a steep, rocky northern face, situated  southwest of the Neumayer Cliffs in the Kirwan Escarpment, Queen Maud Land, Antarctica. It was mapped by Norwegian cartographers from surveys and air photos by the Norwegian–British–Swedish Antarctic Expedition (1949–1952) and additional air photos (1958–59), and named for Stig E. Hallgren, a photographer with the expedition.

References

Mountains of Queen Maud Land
Princess Martha Coast